Wazifa may refer to:

 Wazifa, a regular litany in Sufism
 Wazifa Zarruqiyya, a Shadhili order litany in Sufism